General elections were held in Romania between 18 and 28 May 1914.

Results

Chamber of Deputies

Senate
According to the Constitution, the crown prince and eight bishops had the right to sit in the Senate.

References

Romania
Parliamentary elections in Romania
1914 in Romania
Election and referendum articles with incomplete results
May 1914 events
1914 elections in Romania